Kovalyovka is a rural locality (a selo) in Kovalyovskoye Rural Settlement, Oktyabrsky District, Volgograd Oblast, Russia. The population was 308 as of 2010. There are 6 streets.

Geography 
Kovalyovka is located in steppe, on Yergeni, on the bank of the Aksay River, 19 km southeast of Oktyabrsky (the district's administrative centre) by road. Zhutovo 1-ye is the nearest rural locality.

References 

Rural localities in Oktyabrsky District, Volgograd Oblast